The Tasman Series (formally the Tasman Championship for Drivers) was a motor racing competition held annually from 1964 to 1975 over a series of races in New Zealand and Australia. It was named after the Tasman Sea which lies between the two countries. The Tasman Series races were held in January through to late February or early March of each year, during the Formula One off season, taking advantage of winter in the Northern Hemisphere to attract many top drivers to summer in the south. The Tasman Cup was the permanent trophy awarded to the winning driver.

History 
The Tasman initially started in 1960 as a series of unrelated races between Australia and New Zealand. In 1964 it was renamed Tasman Cup. Until 1969, the Tasman Formula specified open-wheel single-seater racing cars similar to Formula One cars, yet retaining F1 engine rules that were in effect until 1960. Thus, engines of 2500 cm³ that were obsolete for the contemporary Formula One class were eligible for the Tasman Formula.

After F1 upgraded to 3000 cm³ in 1966, the Tasman Formula regulations continued to specify a 2500 cm³ limit for another four years. Usually, the chassis of the previous F1 season were fitted with "Tasman" engines, and entered "down under". In what many consider Tasman's zenith season, 1968, Cosworth even produced a Tasman variant of its legendary DFV V8, known as the DFW, and BRM equipped its cars with a reduced capacity version of their F1 V12. In 1969 both Lotus and Ferrari contested the series with two cars teams, Jochen Rindt and Graham Hill in Lotus 49BTs and Chris Amon and Derek Bell in Dino 246 Tasmania cars which used F2 chassis fitted with modernised versions of the late 1950s F1 2.4 Dino V6 engine. Piers Courage strongly challenged the work teams in a Frank Williams Cosworth 2.5 BT24 Brabham which beat the Lotus and Ferrari teams at Teretonga in New Zealand.

Unfortunately for the Tasman Series, F1's "return to power", coupled to ever increasing costs, reduced the cachet of its Antipodean sister and after 1969 teams became increasingly unwilling to invest significant funds into what many perceived as a lesser championship. Only one Cosworth DFW 2.5 powered car appeared in the 1970 and 1971 Tasman series, Bell driving an uncompetitive Goodyear shod Wheatcroft Brabham BT26 in 3 rounds in 1970 and Amon and fellow Kiwi David Oxton each contesting 2 rounds of 1971 series in the ex Andretti March 701.

In an attempt to reduce costs, the Tasman Formula was extended to incorporate Formula 5000 cars from 1970 and the limit on pure racing engines was reduced from 2.5 litres to 2.0 litres from 1972. Even these changes failed to contain spiralling costs and at the end of the 1975 event the series folded.

The four Australian former Tasman races became the Rothmans International Series from 1976 to 1979 (still under Formula 5000 regulations). The four New Zealand races became the 'Peter Stuyvesant Series' and after 1976 changed to Formula Pacific cars.

Many high-profile local drivers from that era, such as Jack Brabham, Bruce McLaren, Chris Amon and Denny Hulme took part in their home events, but the series also attracted international F1 stars like Jim Clark, Graham Hill, Phil Hill, John Surtees, Jochen Rindt, Pedro Rodríguez and Jackie Stewart, who travelled the long way from Europe.

For two brief years beginning in 1999 the Tasman Series was revived as a series for Formula Holden racing cars with Simon Wills and Andy Booth winning the two series held exclusively in New Zealand.

The Tasman Series was revived as part of the S5000 Series.

Champions

Note: values in parentheses include the results from all races, not all of which counted towards the championship.

See also

Notes

References

External links

 Tasman racing in New Zealand
 Tasman Series history 1967–1969
 Tasman Series history 1970–1976

 
1964 establishments in Oceania
1975 disestablishments in Oceania